The 2015 Pacific-Asia Curling Championships were held from November 7 to 14 at the Baluan Sholak Sports Palace in Almaty, Kazakhstan. The top two teams from the men's and women's tournaments qualified for the 2016 World Men's Curling Championship and the 2016 Ford World Women's Curling Championship, respectively.

Men

Teams

Round-robin standings
Final Round Robin Standings

Round-robin results
All draw times are listed in Asia/Almaty Time (UTC+06).

Draw 3
Monday, November 9, 14:30

Draw 4
Tuesday, November 10, 9:00

Draw 5
Tuesday, November 10, 14:30

Draw 6
Wednesday, November 11, 9:00

Draw 7
Wednesday, November 11, 14:30

Draw 8
Thursday, November 12, 9:00

Draw 9
Thursday, November 12, 14:30

Tiebreaker
Friday, November 13, 14:30

Playoffs

Semifinals
Friday, November 13, 19:00

Bronze-medal game
Saturday, November 14, 9:00

Gold-medal game
Saturday, November 14, 9:00

Women

Teams

Round-robin standings
Final Round Robin Standings

Round-robin results
All draw times are listed in Asia/Almaty Time (UTC+06).

Draw 1
Sunday, November 8, 16:30

Draw 2
Monday, November 9, 9:00

Draw 3
Monday, November 9, 14:30

Draw 4
Tuesday, November 10, 9:00

Draw 5
Tuesday, November 10, 14:30

Draw 6
Wednesday, November 11, 9:00

Draw 7
Wednesday, November 11, 14:30

Draw 8
Thursday, November 12, 9:00

Draw 9
Thursday, November 12, 14:30

Draw 10
Friday, November 13, 14:30

Tiebreaker
Friday, November 13, 19:00

Playoffs

Semifinals
Saturday, November 14, 9:00

Bronze-medal game
Saturday, November 14, 14:30

Gold-medal game
Saturday, November 14, 14:30

References

External links

Pacific-Asia Curling Championships
2015 in curling
Curling competitions in Kazakhstan
2015 in Kazakhstani sport